Greca may refer to:
Greca (clothing), a clerical item of clothing
Greca (given name), an Italian given name
Greca (insignia), an item of military insignia
Greca, another name for a Moka pot stove-top coffee maker
Saint Greca, a Sardinian saint
Rafael Greca, mayor of Curitiba